Yínká is a unisex name in the Yoruba language. It is a contraction of "Yímiká" meaning "surround me." It is also a diminutive form of names such as Adéyínká (crown/royalty surrounds me), Olayinka (prestige/wealth surrounds me), Akínyínká (warriors/valour surrounds me), Olúyínká (God/my lord surrounds me), etc.

People named Yínká include:
Yinka Quadri (born 1959), Nigerian actor, filmmaker, producer and director
Yinka Shonibare (born 1962), Nigerian-British artist
Yinka Ayefele (born 1968), Nigerian music producer
Yinka Davies (born 1970),  Nigerian vocalist, dancer and lyricist
Yinka Dare (1972–2004), Nigerian basketball player
 Oluyinka Idowu (born 1972), Nigerian-born British former long jumper nicknamed "Yinka"
 Yinka Faleti (born 1976), American veteran
Yinka Ayenuwa (born 1986), Nigerian weightlifter
Yinka Olukunga, Nigerian actress
Yinka Ilori, artist
Yinka Bokinini, Presenter and radio DJ

References

Yoruba given names
Unisex given names